The Bowser Gazebo is a historic gazebo at 25 Linden Street in Reading, Massachusetts. It has a low cross-hatched balustrade, above which piers rise to support the octagonal bell-cast roof. The piers are paneled, with circular holes in the paneling. Above the piers is a large area of diagonal cross-hatching, with small rounded arches at the non-entry openings and larger round-arch openings at the entrances.

The gazebo was designed by architect Horace G. Wadlin and built sometime before 1894.  It is one of the only known surviving 19th century gazebos in Reading.  It (and the house on the property) belonged to R. L. Bowser, owner of a local dry goods store.

The gazebo was listed on the U.S. National Register of Historic Places in 1984.

See also
National Register of Historic Places listings in Reading, Massachusetts
National Register of Historic Places listings in Middlesex County, Massachusetts

References

Park buildings and structures on the National Register of Historic Places in Massachusetts
Buildings and structures in Reading, Massachusetts
National Register of Historic Places in Reading, Massachusetts
1894 establishments in Massachusetts
Gazebos